A trial frame is a tool used by ophthalmic professionals like ophthalmologists and optometrists. It is basically an adjustable spectacle frame with multiple cells, used to hold corrective lenses, and other accessories in subjective refraction (finding the correct spectacle power) and retinoscopy.

Uses
To measure a patient's refractive error, squint and presbyopia, it is used to hold lenses, prism or other tools like pinhole occluder. The cells of the trial frame allow holding lenses in correct position.

Although phoropters, which contains lenses allow a quicker refraction, the trial frame help to test near vision at the patient's preferred working distance and position. Since it is portable, a trial frame is ideal for vision and refraction screening during home (domiciliary) visits and outreach camps. Since it allows more natural vision, trial frame refraction is preferred for patients with low vision patients.

Parts
An ideal trial frame have minimum 3 cells, one each for holding spherical lens, cylindrical lens and other tools like occluder or pinhole. Angle for axis of astigmatism is marked on outermost visible cell  There are knobes to adjust pupillary distance, side angle, height and cylindrical lens axis. The nosepiece assembly can be moved front-back and up-down for correct positioning of the lenses in front of the eyes. The length of the legs can also be adjusted. The positions of the two side assemblies give exact measurement of interpupillary distance.

Additional images

References

Ophthalmology
Optometry
Ophthalmic equipment